Charles William Cathcart (July 24, 1809 – August 22, 1888) was a United States representative and Senator from Indiana.

Biography 
He was born in Funchal, Madeira Island, Portugal where his father, James Leander Cathcart was the United States Consul; he travelled to Spain with his parents, attended private schools, and returned to the United States in 1819 and went to sea. He moved to Washington, D.C. in 1830, and was a clerk in the General Land Office. He moved to Indiana and was justice of the peace at New Durham Township in 1833. He engaged in agricultural pursuits near La Porte in 1837, was a United States land surveyor, and was a member of the Indiana Senate from 1837 to 1840.

Cathcart was elected as a Democrat to the Twenty-ninth and Thirtieth Congresses, serving from March 4, 1845, to March 3, 1849; he was appointed to the U.S. Senate to fill the vacancy caused by the death of James Whitcomb and served from December 6, 1852, to January 18, 1853. He was an unsuccessful candidate for election in 1860 to the Thirty-seventh Congress and engaged in agricultural pursuits. He died on his farm near La Porte in 1888; interment was in Pine Lake Cemetery.

References

External links

   

1809 births
1888 deaths
People from Funchal
American people of Irish descent
Democratic Party members of the United States House of Representatives from Indiana
Democratic Party United States senators from Indiana
People from La Porte, Indiana
American surveyors
Clerks
19th-century American politicians